The Longgang Mosque or Lungkang Mosque is a mosque in Zhongli District, Taoyuan City, Taiwan. It is the fifth mosque to be built in Taiwan. As of September 2008, the Imam was Abdullah Liu.

History
In 1953, the United Nations General Assembly passed a resolution condemning the Taipei government for its actions and guerilla warfare inside Burma. Finally, an agreement was reached between Taipei, Rangoon, and Bangkok for evacuation of all Kuomintang Irregular forces under command of General Li Mi to Taiwan. Civil Air Transport transported 5,583 Kuomintang soldiers and 1,040 dependents to Taiwan. The majority of these guerrilla forces were Muslim and had no place to worship in their new Taiwan home and so they started to raise funds to construct a mosque in 1964.

First building
The original building of Longgang Mosque was built in 1967 by a group of 30 Muslims. Built over an area of 1,289 square meters, at first the mosque was very small. But after joining the Chinese Muslim Association, they were able to raise money in the early 1980s, including funds from Saudi Arabia, to build a larger mosque.

Current building

To make a bigger mosque, they purchased a plot of land at Longdong Road in Zhongli. At this US$312,000 initial development stage, only the main prayer hall and basement area of the mosque were built. The mosque building occupies an area of 1,300 square meters and the mosque's main worship area can hold 150 worshippers.

At the US$400,000 second development stage, the mosque's minarets, a kitchen, dormitory and shower room were added to the main building.

Over time, due to the poor materials used to construct the building because of lack of funds, the mosque quickly deteriorated. After some discussion, a plan to reconstruct the mosque was finally put in place. With financial assistance from inside and outside Taiwan, the first reconstruction project for the mosque began in March 1988 and was completed in January 1989. And in 1995, the second reconstruction was completed again resulting in the mosque in use today.

Activities
By 2008, the population of Muslim faithful in Zhongli had reached 2,000. On weekends, and during winter and summer vacations, the mosque holds basic courses on Arabic and the Islamic faith to educate children about Islam.

Architecture

The Longgang mosque is a green structure which has one prayer hall that can accommodate more than 150 people simultaneously. The other features of the mosque includes the imam office, staff office, reception room, children chanting room etc.

Transportation
Longgang Mosque is accessible South East from Zhongli Station of the Taiwan Railways. In the future, the mosque will be closer served from Longgang Station of the Taoyuan Metro.

See also
 Islam in Taiwan
 Chinese Muslim Association
 Chinese Muslim Youth League
 List of mosques in Taiwan

References

External links

 龍崗清真寺 (Longgang Mosque)
 YouTube - Longgang Mosque Documentary Video
 Longgang Mosque Friday Prayer Sermons (Mandarin)

1967 establishments in Taiwan
Mosques completed in 1989
Mosques in Taoyuan City
Rebuilt buildings and structures in Taiwan
Tourist attractions in Taoyuan City
Zhongli District